Arthur W. Worth was a member of the Wisconsin State Assembly during the 1848 session. Worth represented Grant County, Wisconsin. Other positions he held include Treasurer of Lancaster, Wisconsin. He was a Democrat.

References

People from Lancaster, Wisconsin
City and town treasurers in the United States
Democratic Party members of the Wisconsin State Assembly
Year of birth missing
Year of death missing